Godfrey Itama Oboabona (born 16 August 1990) is a Nigerian professional footballer who plays for Georgian club FC Dinamo Batumi as a centre-back.

Club career
Oboabona was born in Ondo City, and began his professional career with local club Sunshine Stars In August 2013, the BBC claimed there was speculation linking him with a move to English side Arsenal, a claim denied by both Oboabona and Sunshine Stars chairman Mike Odoko. 

Later that month, he signed a four-year contract with Turkish club Çaykur Rizespor. He described the transfer as a "dream move." In September 2018, Oboabona joined HNK Gorica in the Croatian First Football League.

In February 2020 he signed for Georgian club FC Dinamo Batumi.

International career
Oboabona made his international debut for Nigeria in 2012, and has appeared in FIFA World Cup qualifying matches. He was called up to Nigeria's 23-man squad for the 2013 Africa Cup of Nations.

He was selected for Nigeria's squad at the 2013 FIFA Confederations Cup, and was named in the provisional squad for the 2014 FIFA World Cup. Oboabona was selected by Nigeria for their 35-man provisional squad for the 2016 Summer Olympics.

References

1990 births
Living people
Nigerian footballers
Nigeria international footballers
Sunshine Stars F.C. players
Çaykur Rizespor footballers
2013 Africa Cup of Nations players
2013 FIFA Confederations Cup players
2014 FIFA World Cup players
Association football defenders
Expatriate footballers in Turkey
Africa Cup of Nations-winning players
People from Akure
Al-Ahli Saudi FC players
HNK Gorica players
Saudi Professional League players
Croatian Football League players
FC Dinamo Batumi players
Erovnuli Liga players
Nigerian expatriate footballers
Nigerian expatriate sportspeople in Turkey
Expatriate footballers in Saudi Arabia
Nigerian expatriate sportspeople in Saudi Arabia
Expatriate footballers in Croatia
Nigerian expatriate sportspeople in Croatia
Expatriate footballers in Georgia (country)
Nigerian expatriate sportspeople in Georgia (country)